Maja Videnović is a politician in Serbia. She has served in the National Assembly of Serbia for most of the period since 2008 as a member of the Democratic Party (Demokratska stranka, DS).

Early life and career
Videnović was born in Belgrade, then part of the Socialist Republic of Serbia in the Socialist Federal Republic of Yugoslavia. She participated in the 
1996–97 protests against the administration of Slobodan Milošević, organizing opposition events at her high school. She later graduated from the University of Belgrade Faculty of Law.

Political career
Videnović was a member of the Assembly of the City of Belgrade and the municipal assembly of New Belgrade from 2004 to 2008. From 2007 to 2011, she was vice-president of the DS city board in Belgrade.

She received the 173th position on the Democratic Party's electoral list in the 2003 Serbian parliamentary election and the forty-eighth position in the 2007 election. The lists won thirty-seven and sixty-four seats, respectively, and she was not chosen for the party's assembly delegation on either occasion. (From 2000 to 2011, parliamentary mandates were awarded to sponsoring parties or coalitions rather than to individual candidates, and it was common practice for the mandates to be distributed out of numerical order. Videnović's numerical position on the lists had no technical bearing on whether or not she received a mandate.)

She received the twentieth position on the Democratic Party's For a European Serbia list in the 2008 parliamentary election. The list won 102 out of 250 seats, and she was on this occasion selected to serve in the assembly. After extended negotiations, the Democratic Party emerged at the head of a coalition government, and Videnović served in the assembly as a government supporter.

Serbia's electoral system was reformed once again in 2011, such that parliamentary mandates were awarded in numerical order to candidates on successful lists. Videnović received the fifty-third position on the Democratic Party's Choice for a Better Life list and was re-elected when the list won sixty-seven mandates. The Serbian Progressive Party and the Socialist Party of Serbia formed a new government after the election, and the DS moved into opposition.

Videnović was promoted to the thirty-third position on the DS's list for the 2014 parliamentary election. The list won only nineteen mandates, and she was not returned. She endorsed party leader Dragan Đilas against a challenge from Bojan Pajtić in 2014; Pajtić was successful, becoming the party's new leader in a delegated vote on 2 June. On the same day, Videnović was elected as one of the party's five vice-presidents. In 2015, she defended National Ombudsman Saša Janković against criticisms from the governing Progressive Party. She was promoted to the ninth position for the 2016 election and was elected to a third term in the assembly when the DS list won sixteen mandates. The party has continued to serve in opposition during this time.

She is currently the deputy chair of the assembly committee on human and minority rights and gender equality; a deputy member of the committee on the diaspora and Serbs in the region, the culture and information committee, the European integration committee, and the security services control committee; a member of Serbia's delegation to the Parliamentary Dimension of the Central European Initiative; and a member of the parliamentary friendship groups with Croatia, France, Israel, Italy, Spain, and the United States of America.

References

1979 births
Living people
Politicians from Belgrade
21st-century Serbian women politicians
21st-century Serbian politicians
Members of the City Assembly of Belgrade
Members of the National Assembly (Serbia)
Members of the Parliamentary Dimension of the Central European Initiative
Democratic Party (Serbia) politicians
Women members of the National Assembly (Serbia)